Deena Shakir is an American venture capitalist. She has served in a number of senior management roles in American corporations.

Early life 
Shakir was born to Iraqi immigrants, and grew up in the San Francisco Bay Area. She studied the arts and social studies at Harvard University and later graduated with a master's degree in foreign service at Georgetown University.

Career 
Shakir had a career as a journalist, where she worked at Al-Arabiya. She has also served briefly in a fellowship and entry level position at the Aspen Institute and USAID.  From 2012 to 2017, she served in middle management roles at Google.org (the division of Google responsible for charitable work). From 2017 to 2019, she was a Partner by GV. She is a contributing columnist at Forbes magazine.

Since 2014, she has been an angel investor for numerous start ups. , she is serving as a partner at Lux Capital. She was named a 'Top Woman in Venture Capital' by Wall Street Journal and as one of the 'Top Leaders in Healthcare' by Business Insider. She spoke at the Fortune magazine Most Powerful Women Summit.

Board Positions 
Deena Shakir serves on the board of Maven Clinic, SteadyMD, Alife Health, Shiru, Allstripes, adyn, and H1.

References 

American venture capitalists
Venture capitalists
Google people
Walsh School of Foreign Service alumni
Harvard College alumni
1985 births
Living people